Fatih Çelik is  a Turkish Para Taekwondo practitioner. He obtained a quota for participation at the 2020 Summer Paralympics in Tokyo, Japan.

References

Living people
Sportspeople from Adana
Paralympic taekwondo practitioners of Turkey
Turkish male taekwondo practitioners
Taekwondo practitioners at the 2020 Summer Paralympics
Year of birth missing (living people)
21st-century Turkish people